Dola is a census town in Shahdol district in the state of Madhya Pradesh, India.

Demographics
 India census, Dola had a population of 5,860. Males constitute 55% of the population and females 48%. Dola has an average literacy rate of 85%, higher than the national average of 59.5%: male literacy is 70% and, female literacy is 53%. In Dola, 14% of the population is under 6 years of age. In Dola, there is a village called New Dola.

References

Cities and towns in Shahdol district
Shahdol